Greenhills is an area within the Scottish new town of East Kilbride, South Lanarkshire in Greater Glasgow.

Greenhills is a residential area on the south eastern boundary of the East Kilbride. The streets are named after trees, ducks and golf courses. The housing stock was built in the early to mid-1970s.

The Greenhills shopping centre is situated adjacent to the highest point in East Kilbride, known locally as 'The High Point', and which is believed to be the motte of a medieval wooden castle. The shopping centre is served by some of the local bus services to and from Glasgow chiefly the 18 and 21 First Glasgow Bus routes.

Until June 2005, Greenhills was served by two secondary schools, Ballerup and St Andrews.  These schools have since merged with two other schools, Duncanrig and St Brides, respectively, as part of East Kilbride's school modernisation programme.
Greenhills is 699 ft (213m) elevation, above sea level.

Notable people
Alex Ferguson, lived in Greenhills while he was the manager of St Mirren (1974–1978)

References

Areas of East Kilbride